Soren Wedege  (born 7 September 1989) is a Danish former tennis player, who represented Denmark in the Davis Cup.

Tennis career
Wedege played in two Davis Cup ties for Denmark, making his debut in 2010. He played two singles matches in Davis Cup, with one win and one loss. He mainly participated on the Futures circuit and partnering with Milos Sekulic, won one Futures doubles title.

ITF Futures titles

Doubles: 1

See also
List of Denmark Davis Cup team representatives

References

External links

1989 births
Living people
Danish male tennis players
21st-century Danish people